Riviera Independent School District is a public school district based in the community of Riviera, Texas (USA).

Located mostly in Kleberg County, a very small portion of the district extends into Kenedy County. It includes the small portion of Corpus Christi in Kleberg County.

Riviera ISD is currently a 2A school and has three campuses - Kaufer High (Grades 9-12), De La Paz Middle (Grades 6-8), and Nanny Elementary (Grades PK-5). Their Mascot is the SeaHawk and their colors are green and white

In 2009, the school district was rated "academically acceptable" by the Texas Education Agency.

The district takes high school students from Ricardo Independent School District and middle and high school students from Kenedy County Wide Common School District.

History

On July 1, 1993, the Laureles Independent School District merged into Riviera ISD.

References

External links
 

School districts in Kleberg County, Texas
School districts in Kenedy County, Texas
Education in Corpus Christi, Texas